Steve Fleet is an English former footballer and football manager.

He played for Manchester City, Wrexham, Stockport County and Altrincham.

He also managed ÍA Akranes and ÍBV

References

Living people
English footballers
Manchester City F.C. players
Wrexham A.F.C. players
Stockport County F.C. players
Altrincham F.C. players
English football managers
Íþróttabandalag Akraness managers
Íþróttabandalag Vestmannaeyja managers
Association football goalkeepers
Year of birth missing (living people)